Schünemann is a German surname. Notable people with the surname include:

Bernd Schünemann (born 1944), German jurist
Otto Schünemann (1891–1944) German General lieutenant
Uwe Schünemann (born 1964) German politician
Werner Schünemann (born 1959) Brazilian actor and film director

German-language surnames